In France, the Conseil supérieur de la propriété littéraire et artistique (Superior Council of Artistic and Literary Property) (CSPLA) is an independent advisory body to advise the Minister of Culture and Communication in the field of literary and artistic property. It also observes and advises on matters of copyright and related rights.

Description

The Higher Council for Literary and Artistic Property was founded on 10 July 2000.

It is chaired by Président and Chairperson Pierre-François Racine, Counsellor of State, appointed by a decree dated October 2, 2012; his vice president is Anne-Élisabeth Crédeville, at the Court of Cassation, appointed by a decree dated October 7, 2010.

List of presidents 
 Pierre-François Racine (since 2012)
 Sylvie Hubac (2010-2012)
 Jean-Ludovic Silicani (2001-2009)

See also
French Intellectual Property Code

References

External links 
  (short official website)
  (long official website)

Organizations established in 2000
French intellectual property law
Government agencies of France
Intellectual property organizations
French copyright law